Legia Warszawa, known in English as Legia Warsaw, is a Polish professional men's volleyball club based in Warsaw, founded in 1929. Eight–time Polish Champion and five–time Polish Cup winner. One of the most successful Polish volleyball clubs of the 20th century. Since the 2021–22 season, the club has been playing in the 1st Polish Volleyball League.

Honours

Domestic
 Polish Championship
Winners (8): 1961–62, 1963–64, 1966–67, 1968–69, 1969–70, 1982–83, 1983–84, 1985–86

 Polish Cup
Winners (5): 1952, 1960–61, 1983–84, 1985–86, 1994–95

International
 CEV European Champions Cup 
Semifinalists (2): 1962–63, 1967–68

See also

References

External links
 Official website 
 Team profile at TAURON1Liga.pl 
 Team profile at Volleybox.net

Polish volleyball clubs
Sport in Warsaw
Volleyball clubs established in 1929
1929 establishments in Poland